

Ernst Johann Rupp (13 January 1892 – 30 May 1943) was a German general in the Wehrmacht during World War II who commanded the 97th Jäger Division. He was a recipient of the Knight's Cross of the Iron Cross of Nazi Germany. Rupp was killed on 30 May 1943, near Krymsk, Soviet Union during the operations at the Kuban bridgehead.

Awards and decorations

 Knight's Cross of the Iron Cross on 7 March 1943 as Generalleutnant and commander of 97. Jäger-Division

References

Citations

Bibliography

 

1892 births
1943 deaths
Lieutenant generals of the German Army (Wehrmacht)
German Army personnel of World War I
Recipients of the clasp to the Iron Cross, 1st class
German Army personnel killed in World War II
Recipients of the Gold German Cross
Recipients of the Knight's Cross of the Iron Cross
Recipients of the Order of Michael the Brave
People from Landshut
People from the Kingdom of Bavaria
Military personnel from Bavaria
German Army generals of World War II